Live at Lollapalooza 2003 is a live album by the American rock band Incubus, released in 2003. The album's proceeds go to the band's charitable arm, the Make Yourself Foundation.

The band performed favorites from their studio albums S.C.I.E.N.C.E., Make Yourself, and Morning View, but there were several other treats for fans in this concert. The band performed "Pistola", a song from the then unreleased album A Crow Left of the Murder..., and covers of Lionel Richie's "Hello" and Shudder to Think's "X-French Tee Shirt". Also, they performed their first live version of "Battlestar Scralatchtica", which featured guest performances from DJ Cut Chemist and DJ Nu-Mark from the band Jurassic 5.

Track listing
 "Warning"
 "Nice to Know You"
 "Make Yourself"
 "The Warmth"
 "Stellar"
 "Circles"
 "Vitamin"
 "Battlestar Scralatchtica"
 "Nebula"
 "Pistola"
 "Are You In?"
 "Nowhere Fast"
 "Wish You Were Here"

Credits

Incubus
Brandon Boyd – vocals
Mike Einziger – guitar
José Pasillas – drums, percussion
Chris Kilmore – turntables, keyboards, mellotron, marxophone
Ben Kenney – bass

Incubus (band) albums
2003 live albums